Phillip Kayode Moses (born 5 June 1994), better known as Pheelz, is a Nigerian record producer, singer and songwriter who has worked with several artists and musicians, such as Olamide and Tiwa Savage. Born and raised in Lagos, Pheelz is credited to have produced all but one song on Olamide's Baddest Guy Ever Liveth album. In 2022, he had a hit with his song "Finesse", a collaboration with Bnxn (formerly known as Buju).

Early life 
Pheelz is a native of Ogun State, but he was born and raised in Ojo, a local government area in Lagos State. He started music as a 10 year old singer in church. While in high school in Ajangbandi Afromedia, Pheelz attended ideal comprehensive high school and later he worked under I.D Cabassa at Coded Tunes, the record label where he met Olamide. In 2011, he featured vocals in a song off Olamide's Rapsodi album titled "I'm Going In".

Career

2012–2020: Working as a producer 
His breakthrough as a record producer came in 2012, when he produced the chart-topping singles by Olamide titled "First of All" and "Fucking with the Devil" off his YBNL album. In 2013, Pheelz was listed in NotJustOks "Top 10 Hottest Producers in Nigeria". He produced all but one song on Olamide's Baddest Guy Ever Liveth album, a move which made him gain grounds in the Nigerian music industry and won him a nomination at The Headies 2013. In 2014, he was also nominated in the Producer of the Year category at the 2014 edition of The Headies and at the 2014 Nigeria Entertainment Awards. Pheelz has gone on to produce and be credited in popular songs and albums including The Chairman by M.I, Ghetto University by Runtown and Seyi or Shay by Seyi Shay. In 2014, Pheelz collaborated with COPILOT Music and Sound on a cover of Carlinhos Brown's "Maria Caipirnha (Samba da Bahia)".  The arrangement represented the musical instrumentation and styles of Nigeria for Visa's "Samba of the World", a digital campaign for the 2014 FIFA World Cup. Pheelz was nominated and won the "Producer of the Year" category at The Headies 2020 edition.

2021–present: Hear Me Out EP 
In 2021 he released his debut EP Hear Me Out  through Empire Distribution.

"One Life" was released as a single off the EP on 26 November 2020, with its lyric video following on 28 December 2020.

Motolani Alake of Pulse Nigeria wrote that it "excels on quality songwriting and good productions". Ikwuje Amos of Mp3bullet called Pheelz "very intentional on the EP".

On 15 March 2022, he signed a record deal with Warner UK, shortly after his single "Finesse" became an international success, and earned him, his first career entry on the Billboard Global 200 at number 131, the TurnTable Top 50 at number 1, World Digital Song Sales at number 10, UK Afrobeats Singles Chart at number 1, and the UK Singles Chart at number 52.

Discography

EPs 
Hear Me Out (2021)

Singles

Awards and nominations

Notes

References 

1994 births
Living people
Nigerian hip hop record producers
21st-century Nigerian musicians
People from Ogun State
Yoruba musicians